The Stockton Heat were a professional ice hockey team in the American Hockey League (AHL) that  played from 2015 to 2022. The team was based in Stockton, California, and was affiliated with the National Hockey League (NHL) Calgary Flames. The Heat played its home games at Stockton Arena. It was a relocation of the Adirondack Flames, joining four other relocated AHL franchises in California that formed the basis for a Pacific Division following the 2014–15 season.

The Heat replaced the ECHL's Stockton Thunder, which played from 2005 until 2015, after which they moved to Glens Falls, New York, where the franchise became the Adirondack Thunder. After the 2021–22 season, the Heat would be relocated to Calgary, Alberta, and would become the Calgary Wranglers. The team had played the entire 2021–22 season in Calgary due to the Covid-19 pandemic restricting cross-border travel.

History
On January 29, 2015, the Calgary Flames announced that they would be moving their AHL affiliate, the Adirondack Flames, to Stockton as one of five charter members of the AHL's new Pacific Division. The team held a name-the-team contest and announced the five finalists as the Blaze, Fire, Heat, Inferno and Scorch on February 24, 2015. The winning name was announced by the Calgary Flames on March 11.

In support of the new division's first season, the AHL played an outdoor game hosted by the Heat. The game, called the Golden State Hockey Rush, was the first AHL outdoor game to be held in California at Raley Field in West Sacramento on December 18, 2015. The Heat defeated the Bakersfield Condors 3–2 in front of 9,357 fans.

The 2019–20 AHL season was curtailed by the COVID-19 pandemic while Stockton was in third place in the Pacific Division and no playoffs were held. The Heat's initial five-year lease with the city to use Stockton Arena expired, but a one-season extension was signed in February 2020. The start of the 2020–21 AHL season was then postponed and eventually led to the creation of temporary Canadian Division due to border crossing restrictions amidst the ongoing pandemic. Due to the Heat being separated from its parent team by the border, the team was relocated for the shortened season to Calgary and shared the Flames' home arena, Scotiabank Saddledome and played only against other Canadian-based AHL teams. 

On May 23, 2022, the Calgary Flames announced the relocation of the Heat, to Calgary, starting in the 2022-23 season. On June 14, 2022, the Heat played their final game, losing to the Chicago Wolves in Game 6 of the Western Conference Finals of the 2022 Calder Cup playoffs.

Season-by-season results

Players

Team captains

Aaron Johnson, 2015–16
Mike Angelidis, 2016–17
Rod Pelley, 2017–18
Byron Froese, 2019–2022

Team records and leaders

Scoring leaders
These are the top-ten point-scorers for the Stockton Heat during their tenure in the AHL.

Note: Pos = Position; GP = Games played; G = Goals; A = Assists; Pts = Points; P/G = Points per game;

References

 
Calgary Flames minor league affiliates
Ice hockey teams in California
Sports in Stockton, California
Ice hockey clubs established in 2015
2015 establishments in California